This article details the Catalans Dragons's rugby league football club's 2020 season.

Fixtures and results 
 

All fixtures are subject to change

Challenge Cup

Regular season

Play-offs

League standings

Discipline

 Red Cards

  Yellow Cards

Player statistics

As of 1 November 2020

2020 squad

2020 transfers

Gains

Losses

Notes

References

External links 
 Catalans Dragons official site  — under construction: 
 Catalans Dragons at Superleague.co.uk
 Sang-Et-Or
 The World of Rugby League
 League Unlimited
 Catalans Dragons stats at rugbyleagueproject.com

Catalans Dragons seasons
2020 in Catalan sport
2020 in French rugby league
Super League XXV by club